Lan's Lantern was a science fiction fanzine edited by George "Lan" Laskowski. It was nominated for the Hugo for Best Fanzine for 1986 through 1996, winning in 1986 and 1991. It is often referred to as an appreciation zine because it specialized in issues with articles celebrating a science fiction single author such as issue #11 which focused on Clifford D. Simak or issue #9 which focused on the writings of Jack Williamson, an early 1950s science fiction author whose work appeared in Amazing Stories. The first issue was published in April 1976 and the final issue #47 was published in December 1998. Issues ranged from 30 to 120 pages each.

George "Lan" Laskowski passed in 1999 and a memorial website was set up at the Science Fiction and Fantasy Writers of America.

References

Hugo Award-winning works
Magazines established in 1976
Magazines disestablished in 1998
Science fiction fanzines
Defunct science fiction magazines published in the United States